Héctor Maximiliano Lucero (born 10 January 1982) is an Argentine professional racing cyclist, who most recently rode for UCI Continental team .

Major results

2008
 1st Mendoza–San Juan
2010
 1st Stage 2 Giro del Sol San Juan
2011
 1st Stage 5 Vuelta a San Juan
 1st Stage 5 Giro del Sol San Juan
2012
 1st Doble Media Agua
 1st Stage 2 Vuelta a San Juan
2015
 1st Stages 5 & 8 Doble Bragado
 1st Stage 9 Vuelta a San Juan
2016
 1st Stage 1 Giro del Sol San Juan
2017
 Vuelta del Uruguay
1st  Points classification
1st Stages 5, 8 & 9
2018
 1st Stages 4 & 10 Vuelta del Uruguay
 1st Stages 2 & 8 Doble Bragado
 1st Stage 3 Giro del Sol San Juan
2019
 1st Stage 4 Vuelta a Mendoza
 1st Stage 2 Giro del Sol San Juan
 3rd Road race, National Road Championships

References

External links

1982 births
Living people
Argentine male cyclists
Sportspeople from San Juan Province, Argentina